The Equal Employment Opportunity Act of 1972 is a United States federal law which amended Title VII of the Civil Rights Act of 1964 (the "1964 Act") to address employment discrimination against African Americans and other minorities. Specifically, it empowered the Equal Employment Opportunity Commission to take enforcement action against individuals, employers, and labor unions which violated the employment provisions of the 1964 Act, and expanded the jurisdiction of the commission as well. It also required employers to make reasonable accommodation for the religious practices of employees.

The employment provisions of the 1964 Act only applied to firms with 25 or more employees; the 1972 Act extended that to firms with 15 or more employees. The version of the bill reported out of the House Committee on Education and Labor would have decreased the threshold to eight employees; however, some senators, including Norris Cotton (R-NH), Paul Fannin (R-AZ), and John C. Stennis (D-MS), expressed concern for the impact on small businesses. (During the debate on the initial version of Title VII in 1964, Cotton in particular had proposed increasing the threshold to 100 employees). Despite support for the eight-employee threshold from other senators such as Jacob Javits (R-NY), the Senate amended the threshold to fifteen, and the House subsequently agreed in conference. The fifteen-employee threshold remains in place as of 2020.

A 1998 study based on Current Population Survey data found that there were "large shifts in the employment and pay practices of the industries most affected" by the 1972 Act, and concluded that it had "a positive impact" on African Americans' labor market status. With regards to government employment, a 1978 study found that the act had little impact on employment of African Americans in the higher levels of the federal civil service.

References

External links

Richard Nixon's signing statement about the Equal Employment Opportunity Act of 1972, from the American Presidency Project

1972 in American law
92nd United States Congress
Anti-discrimination law in the United States
United States federal labor legislation